Richmond Airport  is 2 miles northwest of Richmond, Queensland, Australia. It is operated by the Richmond Shire Council.

Facilities

Airlines and destinations

See also
 List of airports in Queensland

References

Airports in Queensland
North West Queensland